James Carnegie of Finhaven (died 1765) is famous for his trial for the killing of Charles Lyon, 6th Earl of Strathmore and Kinghorne which resulted in the not guilty verdict becoming a recognised part of Scots law and establishment the right of Scots juries to judge the whole case and not just the facts.

Family
James Carnegie was the second son of James Carnegie of Finavon (or Findhaven) in Angus, and a grandson of David Carnegie, 2nd Earl of Northesk. Although his elder brother Charles did not die until 1712, James succeeded to the family estate on his father's death in 1707, under an entail made in 1703.

Carnegie married firstly Margaret, daughter of Sir William Bennet of Grubbet; they had two daughters. His second wife was Violet, daughter of Sir James Naismith of Posso. They had one son and three daughters:
 James, died unmarried at Lisbon in 1777
 Anne, married Sir John Ogilvy of Inverquharity, with issue
 Margaret, married firstly John Foulis of Woodhall and secondly Charles Lewis, with issue
 Barbara, married Sir Robert Douglas of Glenbervie. She inherited Finavon from her brother and sold it in 1779 to the Earl of Aboyne.

Death of the Earl of Strathmore
On 9 May 1728 Mr Carnegie of Lour, residing in the burgh of Forfar, was burying his daughter. Before the funeral, he entertained the Earl of Strathmore, his own brother James Carnegie of Finhaven, Mr Lyon of Bridgeton, and some others, at dinner in his house. After the funeral, these gentlemen adjourned to a tavern, and drank a good deal. Carnegie of Finhaven got extremely drunk. Lyon of Bridgeton was not so intoxicated, but the drink made him "rude and unmannerly" towards Finhaven. Afterwards, the Earl of Strathmore went to call at the house of Mr Carnegie's sister, Lady Auchterhouse (a distant relative of the Earl) and the others followed.

This group, like a large proportion of the Forfarshire gentry of the time supported the Jacobites: and the 6th earl's late brother (the 5th Earl) had fallen at the battle of Sheriffmuir in 1715 fighting for the Old Pretender, as had Patrick Lyon of Auchterhouse, the husband of the lady they were visiting. Bridgeton did not conduct himself as appropriate in the presence of the lady and he even had the audacity to pinch his hostess's arms. Bridgeton was very rude to Finhaven and spoke of: "his not being willing to marry one of his daughters to Lord Rosehill, about his having no sons, about his debts ... and he even used some rudeness towards the lady herself."

It was with the utmost difficulty that Lord Strathmore induced his two companions to leave the house. About dusk, the party sallied forth into the street, and "now that the modified restraint of a lady's presence was removed," Bridgeton pushed Carnegie of Finhaven into a "deep and dirty kennel" (ditch) which ran along the roadside. Carnegie emerged covered nearly head to foot with mud and furious. "Such an insult could only be wiped out with blood." So Carnegie of Finhaven rose, and, drawing his sword, ran up to Bridgeton, with deadly design. The earl, seeing him advance, imprudently threw himself between the two antagonists with the intention of diverting the blow and unhappily received the lunge full in the middle of his own body, the sword passing right through the Earl. The Earl died forty-nine hours after the incident.

Public outcry

There was a huge public outcry to the intended prosecution of Carnegie of Finhaven as illustrated in "A Letter from a Gentleman in Forfar, to his Friend at Edinburgh."
SIR, Forfar, May 16th, 1728.

ACCORDING to your Desire, I have sent you an Account of the lamentable Catastrophe, which happen'd on Thursday the 9th of May instant, which has filled all the Kingdom with an universal Regret ; and this Part of it with the utmost Grief and Confusion imaginable, which is to be seen in the Faces young and old, all over the Country ; the Fact is as follows,

On Thursday being the 9th Instant, several of the neighbouring Gentlemen were invited to this Place to a Burial, and among the rest the Earl of Strathmore, Carnegie of Finhaven, and Mr. Lyon of Brigton; after the Burial was over, a great many of the Gentlemen; among whom were these three before mentioned, went to a Tavern, where after they had been there some Time, Finhaven and Brigton fell a quarrelling, as some say, concerning the Lady Kinfawns, whose Brother Finhaven is; and others say it was about the Marriage of a Daughter of Finhaven's to a young Gentleman in this Country ; but however that be, Finhaven went to take his Horse, and had one foot in the Stirup, as his Servants say, when Brigton attack'd him, and threw him in a Mire, where he had certainly perish'd, had not his Servants come to his Rescue, together with the deceast Earl; Finhaven was no sooner recover'd, and his Servants endeavouring to make clean his Cloaths, but he drew his Sword; and the Earl stepping in to prevent any Mischief that might happen, received from Finhaven a mortal Wound, about an Inch below his Navel, which wounded his Puddings in three Parts, and went quite throrow his Body. His Lordship, after he received the Wound, spoke little till Saturday's Night he called for his Lady, endeavouring to comfort her, and grasping her Hand, he died about 12 a Clock that Night. This is the unfortunate End of this universally beloved Nobleman, whose rare Qualities render'd him an Ornament to his Country, a Pattern of Youth, and the Admiration of all that knew him.

I am Yours, &c.

The trial for murder
Carnegie was tried on 2 August 1728 for premeditated murder, a charge supported by "long arguments and quotations of authority," as was common at that time. The accused man swore that as God was his witness he had no grudge against the earl, but instead he had had the greatest kindness and respect for him. "If it shall appear," he had said, "that I was the unlucky person who wounded the earl, I protest before God I would much rather that a sword had been sheathed in my own bowels." He did not admit his guilt except to say: "I had the misfortune that day to be mortally drunk, for which I beg God’s pardon." Carnegie said that in this state he did not remember seeing the earl when he came out of the ditch.

His defence counsel tried to argue that in the circumstances of the case he was guilty not of murder, but of manslaughter. However, the court, "sacrificing rationality to form and statute," overruled the defence on the basis that the prisoner had "given the wound whereof the Earl of Strathmore died."

The killing being indisputable, Carnegie would have been condemned if the jury had merely given a verdict on the point of fact. In these circumstances, his counsel, Robert Dundas of Arniston, told the jury that they were entitled to judge on "the point of law" as well as the "point of fact". He asserted that they should only decide whether in their conscience Carnegie had committed murder, or whether his guilt was not diminished or annihilated by the circumstances of the case. Quite unexpectedly the jury did not give a verdict of either "proven" or "not proven" but instead gave a verdict of "not guilty", thus establishing the constitutional principle of a Scottish Jury's right to render one of three verdicts: "proven", "not proven" and "not guilty" which remain contentious to this day.

References

Murder in Scotland
Scots law
Trials in Scotland
People from Angus, Scotland
Year of birth unknown
1765 deaths